The Eloyi (also called Afao, Afo, Afu, Aho, Epe, Keffi) are an ethnic group of central Nigeria.
About 100,000 people identify themselves as Eloyi.  They are related to the Idoma ethnic group.

Language

As of 2000, about 25,000 people in the Awe and Nasarawa Local Government Areas (LGAs) of Nasarawa State and the Otukpo LGA of Benue State were reported to speak the Eloyi language, in the Idomoid branch of the Benue-Congo group.
Many use Hausa as their second or primary language.

History

Traditionally, most of the Eloyi lived in a  range of rocky hills in what today is Nasarawa State.
They revolted against the British in 1918, and were then forced to leave their homeland.  
Today they are scattered in different parts of Nasarawa and Benue states, although some have moved back to the original hills.  
The British divided the Eloyi into ten village areas in 1932, appointing a head for each village, but these village heads were not recognized by the Eloyi.

Society

The Eloyi are one of the more economically advanced of the Benue Valley tribes.  In the hills they grow guinea corn, cotton, yams, and tobacco.
They practice in weaving and dying, producing cloth that is much in demand and can be traded.
The Eloyi villages in the hills are made up of round huts with conical thatched roofs grouped around a central courtyard.
In the plains the Eloyi are mostly farmers, selling dried fish and palm oil for cash.
The plains Eloyi build large houses within compounds and fortify their villages.

Organization and beliefs

The village is the largest political unit, independent of its neighbors.  A chief is assisted by a council of elders in administering the village and resolving disputes.
The gado is the father of the village, the authority on customs and law, in charge of planting and harvest rites.
Most Eloyi practice their traditional beliefs, which center on the god Owo, who is symbolized by a white silk cotton tree or a fig tree.
They worship their ancestors, whose spirits are thought to live on and to require food and care.
Religious rites include masked impersonation of ancestors, witchcraft, magic, and divination with strings.
A small number of Eloyi have adopted the Muslim religion.

References
Citations

Sources

Ethnic groups in Nigeria
Benue State
Plateau State